Quianu Robinson (1852-1919) was a New Mexican politician who served as a Republican member of the New Mexico House of Representatives representing the second district of New Mexico from 1916 to 1918.

Early career 
Prior to his election, Robinson was a staunch political ally of Conrad N. Hilton Sr., who had served in the New Mexico Legislature from 1912 to 1916, before retiring and endorsing Robinson in his own run. Robinson served only one term before he retired due to declining health, dying only one year later. Robinson was a member of the Knights of Columbus. Other notable achievements include being the first to summit Robinson Peak in New Mexico, accompanied by Conrad Hilton.

Hagerman-Robinson Expedition 

Quianu Robinson and six other explorers, including Conrad Hilton, were chosen to be members of the Hagerman-Robinson Expedition, and were the first to summit what is now known as Robinson Peak, New Mexico. The Hagerman-Robinson Expedition team was authorized by Herbert James Hagerman, who chose Quianu Robinson, a captain in the New Mexico National Guard as the leader of the team. This expedition was part of a larger effort to  explore and map northern New Mexico, which had been previously uncharted. After the nearly 2 month long journey, Robinson and the other members of the expedition team made their way back home. Robinson Peak has since been named in Quianu's honor.

References 

1852 births
1919 deaths
Catholics from New Mexico
Republican Party members of the New Mexico House of Representatives
Explorers of New Mexico
New Mexico National Guard personnel